The Territory of Ashmore and Cartier Islands is an uninhabited external territory of Australia consisting of four low-lying tropical islands in two separate reefs, and the  territorial sea generated by the islands.

Ashmore Reef is called Pulau Pasir by Indonesians and Nusa Solokaek in the Rotenese language. Both names have the meaning "sand island".

Geography
The territory comprises Ashmore Reef, which includes West, Middle, and East Islands, and two lagoons, and Cartier Reef, which includes Cartier Island.

History
According to Australian literature, Cartier Island was visited by Captain Nash in 1800, and named after his ship Cartier. Ashmore Island was seen by Captain Samuel Ashmore in 1811 from his ship Hibernia and named after him. Ashmore Island was annexed by the United Kingdom in 1878, as was Cartier Island in 1909.

After their annexation, the British government occasionally granted licences on the islands for fishing or guano extraction. In the 1920s, the islands were used as a base for poachers targeting the Western Australian pearling industry. The lack of effective policing led to Australian lobbying for a transfer of control.

A British order-in-council dated 23 July 1931 stated that Ashmore and Cartier Islands would be placed under the authority of the Commonwealth of Australia when Australia passed legislation to accept them, and formal administration began two years later. The Commonwealth's resulting Ashmore and Cartier Islands Acceptance Act 1933 came into operation on 10 May 1934, when the islands formally became a territory. The act authorised the Governor of Western Australia to make ordinances for the territory. In July 1938 the territory was annexed to the Northern Territory, then also administered by the Commonwealth, whose laws, ordinances and regulations applied to the Northern Territory. When self-government was granted to the Northern Territory on 1 July 1978, administration of Ashmore and Cartier Islands was retained by the Commonwealth.

In 1983, the territory was declared a nature reserve under the National Parks and Wildlife Conservation Act 1975, now replaced by the Environment Protection and Biodiversity Conservation Act 1999. Cartier Island, which was a former bombing range, became a marine reserve in 2000.

After the islands became a first point of contact with the Australian migration zone, in September 2001, the Australian government excised the Ashmore and Cartier Islands from the Australian migration zone.

Indonesian heritage and memorandum
Ashmore has been regularly visited and fished by Indonesian fishermen since the early eighteenth century. A 1974 Memorandum of Understanding (MOU) between Australia and Indonesia sets out arrangements by which traditional fishers can access resources in Australia's territorial sea in the region. This allows traditional Indonesian fishermen to access parts of Ashmore for shelter, freshwater and to visit grave sites. The area, known as the MOU Box, contains the Ashmore and Cartier Islands Territory.

Governance
Today, the territory is administered from Canberra by the Department of Infrastructure, Regional Development and Cities, which is also responsible for the administration of the territories of Christmas Island, Cocos (Keeling) Islands, the Coral Sea Islands, Jervis Bay Territory and Norfolk Island.

The Attorney-General's Department had been responsible for the administration of Australian territories until the 2010 federal election. In that year the responsibility for Australian territories was transferred to the then Department of Regional Australia, Local Government, Arts and Sport, and from 18 September 2013 the Department of Infrastructure and Regional Development has administered Australian territories.

Defence of Ashmore and Cartier Islands is the responsibility of Australia, with periodic visits by the Royal Australian Navy, Royal Australian Air Force and the Australia Border Force.

It has no permanently dry land area, although large parts of the reef become exposed during low tide.

Environment and protection

The Ashmore Reef Marine Park and Cartier Island Marine Park are both classed as strict nature reserves (IUCN Ia) and protect biodiverse areas of significant and international importance, as well as cultural heritage.

Cartier Island is an unvegetated sand island, with access prohibited because of the risk of unexploded ordnances. There are no ports or harbours, only offshore anchorage.  Today, all the wells in the Territory are infected with cholera or contaminated and undrinkable. The Australian Border Force vessel  is stationed off the reef for up to 300 days per year. The islands are also visited by seasonal caretakers and occasional scientific researchers.

Economy
The area around the Ashmore and Cartier Islands has been a traditional fishing ground of Indonesian fishermen for centuries, and continues. In the 1850s, American whalers operated in the region. Outside of fishing, the islands were historically used as sources of guano, beche-de-mer, trochus and tortoiseshell. Mining of phosphate deposits took place on Ashmore Island in the latter half of the 19th century.

Petroleum extraction activities take place at the Jabiru and Challis oil fields, which are adjacent to the Territory, and which are administered by the Northern Territory's Department of Mines and Energy on behalf of the Commonwealth.

Migration
As Ashmore Reef is the closest point of Australian territory to Indonesia, it was a popular target for people smugglers transporting asylum seekers en route to Australia. Once they had landed on Ashmore Island, asylum seekers could claim to have entered Australian migration zone and request to be processed as refugees. The use of Ashmore Island for this purpose created great notoriety during late 2001, when refugee arrivals became a major political issue in Australia. The Australian Government argued that as Australia was not the country of first asylum for these "boat people", Australia did not have a responsibility to accept them.

A number of things were done to discourage the use of the Territory for this purpose, such as attempting to have the people smugglers arrested in Indonesia; the so-called Pacific Solution of processing them in third countries; the boarding and forced turnaround of the boats by Australian military forces; and finally excising the Territory and many other small islands from the Australian migration zone.

Two boatloads of asylum seekers were each detained for several days in the lagoon at Ashmore Island after failed attempts by the Royal Australian Navy to turn them back to Indonesia in October 2001.

See also

 Immigration detention in Australia
 SIEV 36

References

External links

 Ashmore and Cartier Islands. The World Factbook. Central Intelligence Agency.
 Geoscience Australia—Ashmore and Cartier Islands
 Department of the Environment and Heritage—Ashmore Reef National Nature Reserve
 Department of the Environment and Heritage—Cartier Island Commonwealth Marine Reserve
 First on list of Australian islands
 "Ashmore Reef Belongs to Indonesia," posted on East Timor Action Network. 
 "Ashmore Islands are member of ARABOSAI" 

 
Ramsar sites in Australia
Important Bird Areas of Australian External Territories
Immigration to Australia
Territorial disputes of Australia
Territorial disputes of Indonesia
Former British protectorates
Ashmore Reef